Lamont or LaMont may refer to:

People
Lamont (name), people with the surname or given name Lamont or LaMont
Clan Lamont, a Scottish clan

Places

Canada 
Lamont, Alberta, a town in Canada
Lamont County, a municipal district in Alberta

United States 
Lamont, California
Lamont, Florida
Lamont, Iowa
Lamont, Kansas
Lamont, Kentucky
Lamont, Nebraska
Lamont, Oklahoma
Lamont, Washington
Lamont, Wisconsin, a town
Lamont (community), Wisconsin, an unincorporated community
Lamont–Doherty Earth Observatory, New York

Music
Lamont Harp, one of only three surviving medieval Gaelic harps

Other uses
Lamont (lunar crater), a crater on the Moon
Lamont (Martian crater), a crater on Mars
Lamont Gallery, an art gallery in Exeter, New Hampshire
Lamonts, a chain department store

See also
Lamonte (disambiguation)